The 1991 Champ Car season may refer to:
 the 1990–91 USAC Championship Car season, which was just one race, the 75th Indianapolis 500 
 the 1991 CART PPG Indy Car World Series, sanctioned by CART, who would later become Champ Car